The 1971–72 Minnesota North Stars season was the Stars' fifth season of operation in the National Hockey League (NHL). The Stars finished in second place in the West Division and qualified for the playoffs, where they lost in the first round to the St. Louis Blues.

Offseason

Regular season

Final standings

Schedule and results

Playoffs

Playoffs
For the fourth time in their first five seasons, the North Stars were in the playoffs. Once again, they had a matchup with the Blues in the postseason. The two teams would not meet again in the postseason until 1984.

Stanley Cup Quarterfinals

St. Louis Blues win 4–3

Player statistics

Awards and records

Transactions

Draft picks
Minnesota's draft picks at the 1971 NHL Amateur Draft held at the Queen Elizabeth Hotel in Montreal, Quebec.

Farm teams

See also
1971–72 NHL season

References

External links

Minnesota
Minnesota
Minnesota North Stars seasons
Minnesota North Stars
Minnesota North Stars